The New Southern Hotel is a historical hotel in Jackson, Tennessee, USA.

Location
The hotel is located at 112-120 East Baltimore Street in Jackson, a city in Madison County, Tennessee, USA.

History
The site of the hotel once served as headquarters for Colonel Carroll Marsh of the 11th Illinois Regiment during the city of Jackson's Union occupation. After the war, the house that stood there, known as the Trimmer House, was used as a hotel from 1870 until the New Southern Hotel's construction in 1927. The hotel was constructed by a partnership between hoteliers A.D Noe and Son, investor Ira Krupnick, and hotel developers Albert Pick & Co. in order to meet the city's growing need for business-class lodging. The hotel offered a central location in Courthouse Square and spaces for businessmen to entertain prospective clients. It featured a dining room, multiple ballrooms, men's and ladies' parlors, and a coffee shop. It soon became an entertainment hub for politicians, local service clubs, and various organizations. It was known to host political rallies, fraternal conventions, academic conferences, weddings, proms, and retirement parties. 

By the 1960s, roadside motels grew in popularity, causing the New Southern's business to decline. In 1970, the hotel closed and was converted into office spaces, which proved unsuccessful. In 1976, the New Southern underwent major renovations to turn its upper floors into a residential center for senior citizens. At this time, many of the plaster ceilings and original finishes were preserved behind the new additions and are awaiting future restoration.

On May 4, 2003, a tornado damaged the building, and it was restored by Crocker Construction Co. for the next two years.

Architectural Significance
The New Southern was designed by architect Reuben A. Heavner, who is also known for his work on the main hall of Lane College. Its exterior is in the Renaissance Revival style with a facade that features terra cotta details, festoons, and arched window transoms. The interior of the building is designed in an eclectic style with Mediterranean Revival influences. It has been listed on the National Register of Historic Places since November 21, 2002.

Popular Culture 
A music video for the song "Stella" by Hunter Cross was filmed at the hotel.

References

Buildings and structures in Madison County, Tennessee
Hotel buildings on the National Register of Historic Places in Tennessee
Hotel buildings completed in 1927
Hotels in Tennessee
Jackson, Tennessee
National Register of Historic Places in Madison County, Tennessee